Mark Bruintjes (born 26 June 1996) is a Dutch footballer who plays as a centre-back for Harkemase Boys in Derde Divisie.

Professional career
Bruintjes joined the PEC Zwolle youth academy as a child, and went through all the levels, eventually captaining the youth teams. Bruintjes made his professional debut for PEC Zwolle in a 3-1 Eredivise win over Feyenoord on 14 February 2016.

On 15 June 2018, he joined fourth-tier Derde Divisie club Harkemase Boys.

References

External links
 
 
 Eredivisie Profile

1996 births
Living people
Sportspeople from Zwolle
Dutch footballers
PEC Zwolle players
Eredivisie players
Association football defenders
Derde Divisie players
Harkemase Boys players
Footballers from Overijssel